Santa Josefa, officially the Municipality of Santa Josefa,  is a 3rd class municipality in the province of Agusan del Sur, Philippines. According to the 2020 census, it has a population of 26,432 people.

Geography

According to the Philippine Statistics Authority, the municipality has a land area of  constituting  of the  total area of Agusan del Sur.

Climate

Santa Josefa is classified as Type II climate which has no dry season but with pronounced maximum rain period occurring from December to January.

Barangays
Santa Josefa is politically subdivided into 11 barangays.

Demographics

In the 2020 census, Santa Josefa had a population of 26,432.

Economy

Santa Josefa's main products are rice and corn.

References

External links
 [ Philippine Standard Geographic Code]

Municipalities of Agusan del Sur